Berberis dictyota, now reclassified as Berberis aquifolium var. dictyota, with the common names Jepson's oregon grape and  shining netvein barberry, is a flowering plant in the Barberry family.

Description
Leaves are pinnate, with 5-7 leaflets; leaflets thick and rigid, whitish with a thick waxy layer on the underside, up to 9 cm long, with spines along the edges.

Yellow flowers are borne in dense racemes of up to 50 flowers. The bloom period is February through April.

Berries are egg-shaped, dark blue, sometimes with a waxy coating, up to 7 mm long.

Distribution and habitat
The plant is endemic to California. It is very widespread, found from the Peninsular Ranges in San Diego County north to the Klamath Mountains in Siskiyou County, and east to the Sierra Nevada.

See also

References

External links
  Calflora Database:  Berberis aquifolium var. dictyota (Jepson's oregon grape,  Shining netvein barberry)
 Jepson Manual eFlora (TJM2) treatment of Berberis aquifolium var. dictyota
  U.C. Calphotos gallery of Berberis aquifolium var. dictyota

dictyota
Endemic flora of California
Flora of the Klamath Mountains
Flora of the Sierra Nevada (United States)
Natural history of the California chaparral and woodlands
Natural history of the California Coast Ranges
Natural history of the Peninsular Ranges
Natural history of the Transverse Ranges
Plants described in 1891
Taxa named by Willis Linn Jepson
Plants used in Native American cuisine
Flora without expected TNC conservation status